Coelotanypus is a genus of midges in the family Chironomidae. There are about 5 described species in Coelotanypus.

Species
 Coelotanypus atus Roback, 1971
 Coelotanypus concinnus (Coquillett, 1895)
 Coelotanypus naelis Roback, 1963
 Coelotanypus scapularis (Loew, 1866)
 Coelotanypus tricolor (Loew, 1861)

References

Further reading

External links

 

Tanypodinae